Galanas in Welsh law was a payment made by a killer and his family to the family of his or her victim. It is similar to éraic in Ireland and the Anglo-Saxon weregild.

The compensation depended on the status of the victim, but could also be affected by the circumstances of the killing, for example a killing from ambush or by poison meant the payment of double galanas. The payment was due from relatives as distant as the fifth cousins of the killer, with each degree of relationship paying double the rate of the next, for example first cousins of the killer paid double the sum payable by second cousins. Women paid half the rate of payment by men. The first third of the galanas falls on the homicide, his father and mother and brothers and sisters.  The remainder is shared between the kindred, with two thirds falling on the father's kindred and one third on the mother's kindred.

The same rules applied to the receipt of galanas. In the existing texts, dating from the 13th century, one third of the sum paid was due to the Lord as the enforcing authority, but this is considered to be an innovation.

See also
Blood money
Diyya
Éraic
Główszczyzna
Weregild

References
 Dafydd Jenkins (1986) The law of Hywel Dda: law texts from mediieval Wales (Gomer Press) 

Welsh law
Legal history of Wales
Compensation for victims of crime